Chur railway station serves the town of Chur, capital of the canton of Graubünden, Switzerland. Opened in 1858, it is the most important railway junction in Graubünden.

The station is the terminus of the Swiss Federal Railways (SBB CFF FFS) standard-gauge main line from Zürich, and is also one of the most important stations on the Rhaetian Railway (RhB) metre-gauge network.

Since 1986, on top of it one finds the central Grisonian PostAuto/AutoDaPosta bus terminal.

SBB InterCity, InterRegio, and RegioExpress services stop at the station, alongside Rhaetian Railway InterRegio, RegioExpress and Regio services. The station is also served by several Deutsche Bahn InterCity Express trains and by the Glacier Express. Finally, local service is provided by both the St. Gallen and Chur S-Bahn networks.

History and development

1850-1895
Planning for a station at Chur began in 1850. After heated debate, the station was built at its present site, just outside the city limits, and designed as a terminus of the Rheineck–Chur railway.

The first operator of the station was the United Swiss Railways. Initially, only a temporary wooden goods shed was constructed as a station building. But in 1860 work was completed on a station building still visible today in modified form. In 1876, that building was moved to a new location on the Gürtelstrasse, where it has remained ever since.

With continuing increases in tourism in the area, a new station building was completed on 1 November 1878. It still exists today, but over the years has undergone several modifications.

1896-1985
In 1896, the Rhaetian Railway opened a narrow gauge line between Landquart and Thusis.  The first  of that line ran parallel with the already well established standard gauge line between Landquart and Chur.

Due to a ruling by the Swiss Federal Council, the Rhaetian Railway was forced to abandon plans for a railway station of its own in Chur, and instead had to integrate itself into the existing United Swiss Railways station.

In 1903, the Albula Railway was opened, making necessary another expansion of Chur station. In 1914, traffic at the station increased even further, with the opening of the Chur–Arosa railway. Between 1926 and 1928, following yet another sharp increase in traffic, the station was completely rebuilt. As part of the late 1920s renovation, the number of tracks was increased, new bridges were built, and the track layout was simplified.  Simultaneously, buildings from earlier times were refurbished, and new buildings were erected.

1985-present
The station is located in the centre of the town of Chur, and forms the transition between the old and new towns.

The most striking of the station's buildings is now the roof over the Postauto bus station, which is located above the station platforms.

In 1986, the architects Richard Brosi and Robert Obrist won first prize in a competition for the design of the bus station, including its roof. Their idea was to create an airy concourse, and the structure built to their design was completed in 1993.

Comprehensive redevelopment of the station began in 2000. The complete redesign of the station was a joint project of the SBB-CFF-FFS, the Rhaetian Railway and the town of Chur. As part of the redevelopment, a new pedestrian underpass was opened in 2003. By 2006, the underpass had been expanded to the south. As a connection to the southern end of the underpass, a new shopping mall was opened. Meanwhile, the height of the platforms was raised to Switzerland's usual height of 55 cm, and the platform roofs were renewed.

The old station building, which was called Belle Epoque, was completely renovated in a project completed in 2007. Between the tracks of the SBB and those of the Rhaetian Railway's Chur-Arosa line is now a new office and retail building.

The Chur bus station was moved closer to the railway station and has a direct connection to the underground shopping arcade. Also, the Bahnhofplatz in front of the station was extensively renovated in 2007.

Arosabahn
Chur is also the lower terminus of the Chur-Arosa line (the Arosabahn), which has its own dedicated platforms (numbers 1 & 2) at the front of Chur station, on Bahnhofplatz.

Hourly passenger services operate on the Arosa line (service "R4" on the Rhaetian network) to the town and resort of Arosa, calling at a number of places between. The route is shown as timetable 930 in the Swiss national timetables.

Services

Long-distance
The following long-distance services call at Chur:

 Intercity Express: Two round-trips per day over the Chur–Rorschach line to Hamburg.
 InterCity: Hourly service over the Chur–Rorschach line to Basel SBB or Zürich Hauptbahnhof.
 Glacier Express: Several round-trips per day over the Landquart–Thusis line between Zermatt and St. Moritz.

Regional
The following regional services call at Chur:

 InterRegio:
 Hourly service over the Chur–Rorschach line to Zürich Hauptbahnhof.
 Hourly service over the Landquart–Thusis line to St. Moritz
 RegioExpress: Hourly service over the Landquart–Thusis line between Disentis/Mustér and Scuol-Tarasp.

Local
Chur is served by S12 of the St. Gallen S-Bahn, S1 and S2 of the Chur S-Bahn, and regional trains on the Chur–Arosa line:

 : hourly service over the Landquart–Thusis line between Rhäzüns and Schiers.
 : hourly service over the Landquart–Thusis line to Thusis.
 : half-hourly service over the Chur–Rorschach line to Sargans.
 Regio: hourly service over the Chur–Arosa line to Arosa.

Bus stations

Other stations in Chur
There are three other railway stations in Chur:

 Chur Stadt (on the Chur-Arosa line)
 Chur West (towards Thusis)
 Chur Wiesental (towards Landquart)

Images

References

External links

 
 

Railway stations in Graubünden
Rhaetian Railway stations
Swiss Federal Railways stations
Transport in Chur
Railway stations in Switzerland opened in 1858